Penketh is a civil parish and suburb of Warrington in the Borough of Warrington, Cheshire, England. It has a population of 8,699. It is in the historic county of Cheshire.

The name is derived from two Brythonic words: *penno- (head) and *kēto- (trees) (Welsh pen coed); suggesting that the parish was at one time on the outskirts of a forest. The emblem/badge of Penketh is three kingfishers.

History
Penketh was originally part of Prescot parish but became a chapelry and then a separate parish. It grew due to the crossing over the Mersey at Fiddlers Ferry and the building of the Sankey Canal. The area was mainly rural and agricultural until well into the 20th century, though a tannery and boatyard were established in the 19th century.

The last 50 years has seen the area transformed into a large residential suburb.

Governance
Historically within Lancashire, but now within Cheshire, the parish has a Parish Council and is a ward of Warrington Borough. It is in Warrington South constituency of the United Kingdom Parliament. Until the major local government reorganisation of 1974, Penketh was part of Widnes  Warrington Rural District.

Industry
The former tannery and boatyard were the only major industries in Penketh. Fiddlers Ferry Power Station dominates Penketh, though it is in Cuerdley parish.

Churches
There is a parish church (St Paul's, Church of England), and a Catholic church (St Joseph's). There is  a strong nonconformist tradition as exemplified by the Methodist chapel in Chapel Road. The Quakers were well represented at one time; the Meeting House was the present village hall on Meeting Lane.

Schools
The secondary schools in the area are Penketh High School and St Gregory's Catholic High School (which isn't actually in Penketh). The primary schools in the area are Penketh Community Primary School (a feeder school for Penketh High School), Penketh South Primary School, St Joseph's Catholic Primary School and St Vincent's Catholic Primary School.

Pubs
Pubs in the area include the Ferry Tavern, the Crown & Cushion, the Sportsman's Arms and the Red Lion.

Transport
Railway stations in the area include local services from Sankey for Penketh on the Liverpool to Manchester Line (with express services along this route available from Warrington Central), as well as Warrington Bank Quay on the West Coast Main Line. Frequent buses link Penketh with Warrington town centre: it is the terminus for Warrington's Own Buses (routes 30, 30B, 31 and 32A), and the north of Penketh is also served by Warrington's Own Buses routes 14 and 15. Arriva North West inter-urban services also serve the main road through Penketh, heading towards Widnes and Runcorn (route 110) and to Huyton and Liverpool (route 7). Penketh is on the A562 road linking Warrington with the Silver Jubilee Bridge. The nearest airports are Liverpool and Manchester.

Demographics
7,340 residents
2,993 households
29.4% of all residents have no qualifications (approximately 2,158 residents)
2.06% are unemployed (approximately 154 residents)

Race and gender
48% males to 52% females
98.3% are of white race
0.6% are of mixed origin
0.7% are of Asian origin
0.1% are of black race
0.4% are of "other" race

Housing demographics
92.0% Owner occupied
3.7% are council accommodation
0.4% are rented from a housing association
2.0% are private rentals
1.3% are rentals from other sources
0.6% are undisclosed

See also

Listed buildings in Penketh

References

External links

Warrington
Civil parishes in Warrington
Villages in Cheshire